The highland stoneroller (Campostoma spadiceum) is a species of fish in the family Cyprinidae. It is endemic to the United States where it occurs in certain drainages of the Red, Ouachita, and lower Arkansas river basins from eastern Oklahoma to central Arkansas.

References

Campostoma
Taxa named by Charles Frédéric Girard
Fish described in 1856